The Lavaca County Courthouse, in Hallettsville, Texas, is a courthouse which was built in 1897.  It was listed on the National Register of Historic Places in 1971.

It is the fifth structure serving as county seat for Lavaca County, originally "La Baca" County.

It was designed by architect Eugene T. Heiner.

It is a Richardsonian Romanesque-style courthouse, "strongly influenced" by H.H. Richardson's 
design of the Allegheny County Courthouse in Pittsburgh, Pennsylvania.  It is a raised three-story limestone building, cruciform in plan, with a hipped roof and pyramidal roofs and dormers.

It is a Texas State Antiquities Landmark.

See also

National Register of Historic Places listings in Lavaca County, Texas
List of county courthouses in Texas

References

External links

County courthouses in Texas
National Register of Historic Places in Lavaca County, Texas
Romanesque Revival architecture in Texas
Government buildings completed in 1897